This is a list of some of the most notable films produced in Cinema of Germany in the 2020s.

For an alphabetical list of articles on German films, see :Category:2020s German films.

2020

2021

2022

2023
List of German films of 2023

References

2020s
Lists of 2020s films